Phyllostachys propinqua  is a species of bamboo found in the Chinese provinces of Anhui, Fujian, Guangxi, Guizhou, Henan, Hubei, Jiangsu, Jiangxi, Yunnan, and Zhejiang.

References

External links
 
 

propinqua
Flora of China